In enzymology, a hydroxyphytanate oxidase is an enzyme that catalyzes the chemical reaction

L-2-hydroxyphytanate + O2  2-oxophytanate + H2O2

Thus, the two substrates of this enzyme are L-2-hydroxyphytanate and O2, whereas its two products are 2-oxophytanate and H2O2.

This enzyme belongs to the family of oxidoreductases, specifically those acting on the CH-OH group of donor with oxygen as acceptor.  The systematic name of this enzyme class is L-2-hydroxyphytanate:oxygen 2-oxidoreductase. This enzyme is also called L-2-hydroxyphytanate:oxygen 2-oxidoreductase.

References

 

EC 1.1.3
Enzymes of unknown structure